Stuart David Price (born 9 September 1977) is an English electronic musician, DJ, songwriter, and record producer known for his work with artists including Madonna, Dua Lipa, The Killers, New Order, Kylie Minogue, DMA's, Example, Take That, Missy Elliott, Scissor Sisters, Pet Shop Boys, Brandon Flowers, Gwen Stefani, Seal, Keane, Jessie Ware, Frankmusik, Hard-Fi, Hurts, Everything Everything, Rina Sawayama, and Darin.  His acts include his own band Zoot Woman (with Adam Blake and Johnny Blake), Les Rythmes Digitales (literally "The Digital Rhythms"), Paper Faces, Man with Guitar, Thin White Duke (not to be confused with David Bowie's earlier persona of the same name), and the parodic French moniker Jacques Lu Cont (though he actually grew up in Reading, England).

Solo and group work
Price was born in Paris, France, but grew up in Reading, Berkshire. His musical career started with two acts working simultaneously, releasing music on London-based label, Wall of Sound. He formed Zoot Woman with Adam Blake and Johnny Blake, and their debut 12", Sweet to the Wind EP, was released in 1995. Around the same time, under the pseudonym Jacques Lu Cont, Price was making music as Les Rythmes Digitales. Initially choosing the name as a reference to the explosion in demand for French house in the United Kingdom during the 1990s, Price even went as far as to conduct interviews with British journalists in French via an interpreter. In interviews from around this time, Price also claimed that he had grown up listening exclusively to classical music, until one day encountering the album Dare by the Human League.

The first Les Rhythmes Digitales album, Liberation, was released in 1996. A single, "Jacques Your Body (Make Me Sweat)", followed the next year. It was re-released in 1999, reaching #60 on the UK Singles Chart, and was included on that year's album, Darkdancer. Greatly influenced by 1980s dance music, Darkdancer would later be included in Vice magazine's 99 Greatest Dance Albums of All Time list.

Zoot Woman released their debut album, Living in a Magazine, in 2001, following it up in 2003 with an eponymous album. The same year, Price released DJ mix album FabricLive.09, part of a series of mix releases from London club Fabric, under his Jacques Lu Cont moniker. He made his first original release under the name the following year; "...And Dance" was a single featuring General Degree. Another Zoot Woman album, Things Are What They Used To Be, was released in 2009, and further Jacques Lu Cont singles followed, released both in physical formats and as free downloads from Soundcloud.

As producer
Price has produced, and at times co-written, numerous songs for popular artists. Price has also remixed and re-produced numerous songs under his own name as well as the names Thin White Duke (originally created by David Bowie), Jacques Lu Cont, and Les Rythmes Digitales. Other aliases include Man with Guitar and Paper Faces (an alias for him and Adam Blake of the band Zoot Woman). Price's remixes are characterised by club-lead beats with arpeggios, riffs, and vocal lines faded and filtered throughout the song for a climactic effect.  He favours keeping the original vocal arrangement of songs and re-contextualizing the non-lyrical content in creating his new versions.

Madonna
Price is best known for his work with Madonna's tenth studio album Confessions on a Dance Floor (2005). He began collaborating with Madonna as musical director for her 2001 Drowned World Tour after remixing some of the tracks on her Music album via Mirwais. He reprised the role for her 2004 Re-Invention World Tour and 2006 Confessions Tour. Price created remixes for the album's singles "Hung Up", "Sorry" (under the Man with Guitar alias), "Get Together", and "Jump", as well as the album tracks "I Love New York" and "Let It Will Be" (under the Paper Faces alias). Price co-wrote the song "X-Static Process" for Madonna's 2003 album American Life. Price has also remixed the Madonna songs "Hollywood" from American Life and "Miles Away" from the album Hard Candy. Madonna chose his remix of "Hollywood" for her performance at the MTV Video Music Awards with Britney Spears, Christina Aguilera, and Missy Elliott.

The Killers
Price's work with The Killers began with his remix of their hit single "Mr. Brightside", released under the Thin White Duke name. Subsequently, Price remixed the song "When You Were Young", the first single from The Killers album "Sam's Town". Price produced two of the tracks re-recorded for the release of The Killers' B-sides album, Sawdust: "Leave the Bourbon on the Shelf" and "Sweet Talk". His remix of "Mr. Brightside" appeared as a bonus track on that release. Price went on to produce The Killers' third studio album, "Day & Age", released on 24 November 2008. He also created an extended remix of the lead single "Human" released under the Thin White Duke name. Price also worked for The Killers vocalist Brandon Flowers' debut solo album Flamingo, producing most of the songs on it, including the second single "Only the Young". The album was released on 6 September in the UK and Ireland and 14 September in the US and Canada.

The Killers' album, Battle Born, contains two tracks that Price produced, as well as a Jacques Lu Cont remix of the album's first track, "Flesh and Bone".

Price also produced the song "Just Another Girl", a new track on the Killers compilation album Direct Hits.

In the deluxe version of The Killers' 2017 album, Wonderful Wonderful, Price did a remix of the album's single, "The Man".

Pet Shop Boys
Price was the musical director on the Pandemonium tour, and produced their 2013 album Electric which was very highly acclaimed by critics and reached No. 3 on the UK Albums Chart – their highest charting album since 1993. He also toured with them on at least several shows in the Electric tour (Las Vegas and Oakland). Price went on to produce their albums Super and Hotspot released in 2016 and 2020 respectively. Both albums received positive reviews and reached No. 3 on the UK Album Chart.

Kylie Minogue
Price is the executive producer for Kylie Minogue's 11th studio album titled Aphrodite which was released on June 30, 2010. On 11 June, the hit single "All the Lovers" was released, and later "Get Outta My Way", which was remixed by Price into an extended version.

Other production work
Price was the album producer on Seal's fifth studio album System, which was released in November 2007. He also co-wrote several of the album's songs. Price was among the producers of Keane's album Perfect Symmetry, which was released in October 2008.

Price was also reported to be working with New Order's Bernard Sumner on a "synthesiser album". However, it appears the project has been shelved

Price co-produced the Scissor Sisters album Night Work, released on 28 June 2010. The first track to be released from the album was "Invisible Light", followed by singles "Fire With Fire" and "Any Which Way".

In 2010, Price produced Take That's studio album Progress which saw Robbie Williams return to the band.  Progress was the biggest selling album of 2010 and the second fastest selling British album of all time. In 2011, he worked as a producer on Hard-Fi's 2011 album Killer Sounds. He worked with the band for second single "Fire in the House". In May 2012, the fourth Scissor Sisters album Magic Hour was released with two tracks produced by Stuart Price: "The Secret Life of Letters" and "Somewhere".

For the London 2012 Olympic Games, Price was asked to create a theme song as the keystone of what director Danny Boyle called the "sonic branding" of the games. Intended to be played in multiple venues, Price set out to create a modular piece, "Different elements can layer on top of each other to create a fast-paced version for the velodrome, something slow for the background on TV, or a triumphant version of it for the medal ceremonies."

In 2014, Price produced multiple tracks on Take That's seventh studio album III.

In 2015, Price produced the critically acclaimed studio album Get to Heaven by Manchester-based band Everything Everything which Digital Spy described as "a contender for album of the year".  Q also awarded the album 5 stars.

In 2017, Price produced with many different people. His first venture was with Kiesza on her 2017 single, entitled "Dearly Beloved", which is expected to be the lead single on her upcoming second album. He also was credited as Jacques Lu Cont when remixing The Knocks's single "Trouble", featuring vocals from Absofacto. The song became the second single to be released from their fifth extended play, entitled Testify.

In 2019, Price produced British band Sundara Karma's second album Ulfilas' Alphabet.

In 2020, Price served as a co-producer and additional producer on the Dua Lipa "Future Nostalgia" album, in 4 songs, where 3 of them: "Hallucinate",  "Levitating" and "Love Again" became singles.
He also produced the release of Aussie rockers DMA's third studio album The Glow (DMA's album) that has been met with positive reviews.

In May 2022, the single "Superstar" by Swedish singer Darin was released and produced by Price.

Price is also one of the listed producers on Japanese-British singer/songwriter Rina Sawayama's second studio album Hold the Girl, which was released on September 16, 2022.

Remixes
Price remixed Coldplay's single "Viva la Vida", released on the band's website as the Thin White Duke remix. Price has also produced and mastered tracks for Frankmusik's debut album, one of which is "3 Little Words". This track was released as a single on the "3 Little Words" EP. He provided two Thin White Duke remixes for the release of Depeche Mode's 2009 single, "Wrong".

In 2009, Price remixed "It's Not My Problem" for Sneaky Sound System under the Thin White Duke alias, as well as doing remixes for Depeche Mode's "Wrong", Friendly Fires' "Jump in the Pool", Röyksopp's "This Must Be It" and, most recently, Muse's "Undisclosed Desires". Producing the tour arrangement for the Pandemonium Tour by Pet Shop Boys, Price fulfilled a personal dream. He also produced an exclusive arrangement for Pet Shop Boys' Brit Awards performance in February. Both older hits and brand new songs were combined to create a ten-minute-long mash up that closed the 2009 Brits.

He mixed and remixed Miike Snow single "The Rabbit", then produced Take That's album Progress, featuring their reunion with Robbie Williams, later working again on their first EP, Progressed, released in summer 2011. Meanwhile, the band promoted their Progress Live which featured Price as musical director. Price mixed and co-produced several tracks on Duffy's album Endlessly, including first single "Well, Well, Well".

Under his Jacques Lu Cont alias, he released several massive club remixes including ones for U2, Katy Perry, Miike Snow and Coldplay. Under this alias he also remixed Glasgow band Bis' single Eurodisco.

In June 2012 his remix of Charlie Brown was rejected by Coldplay, though Price did end up having it released through Annie Mac's show on BBC Radio One on 13 July.

He also created a remix of Juliet's "Avalon".

Stuart is managed by Lucas Keller and Alex Harrow at Milk & Honey, and published by Warner Chappell for the world.

Awards

Grammy Awards

|-
! scope="row"| 2005
|rowspan="6"| Grammy Awards
|rowspan="2"| Best Remixed Recording, Non-Classical
| "It's My Life (Jacques Lu Cont's Thin White Duke Mix)"
| 
|rowspan="6"| 
|-
! scope="row" rowspan="2"| 2006
| "Mr. Brightside (Jacques Lu Cont's Thin White Duke Mix)"
| 
|-
|rowspan="2"| Best Dance Recording
| "Guilt Is a Useless Emotion"
| 
|-
! scope="row" rowspan="3"| 2007
| "Get Together"
| 
|-
| Best Dance/Electronic Album
| Confessions on a Dance Floor
| 
|-
| Best Remixed Recording, Non-Classical
| "Talk (Thin White Duke Mix)"
| 

In 2011, Price won a Music Week Award for Best Producer of the Year.

June 2015, saw Price inducted into Pete Tong's Hall of Fame.

Discography

Albums 
Les Rythmes Digitales
Libération (1996)
Darkdancer (1999)
Jacques Lu Cont
Blueprint (2000)
FabricLive.09 (2003)
Palindrome (ambient album) (2013)

Tracques
Tracques Volume 1 (2013)

Zoot Woman (with Adam Blake and Johnny Blake)
Living in a Magazine (2001)
Zoot Woman (2003)
Things Are What They Used to Be (2009)
Star Climbing (2014)
Absence (2017)
Redesigned (2018)
Maxidrama (TBC)

Singles

Songwriting and production list

References

External links
Zoot Woman official website

1977 births
Living people
Musicians from Berkshire
People from Reading, Berkshire
English DJs
English electronic musicians
English record producers
English songwriters
English dance musicians
Ivor Novello Award winners
Grammy Award winners
Remixers
People from Bedale
Electronic dance music DJs